Obdržálek is a Czech surname. Notable people with the surname include:

 Peregrin Obdržálek (1825–1891), Catholic priest and author
 Petr Obdržálek (born 1986), Czech ice hockey player

Czech-language surnames